John Harrold is a former mayor of Glendora, California.

Harrold was elected to the Glendora City Council in 1999 and became a mayor in 2001. He was voted out in a recall election in 2002.

Ever since getting recalled from the city council, Harrold has been very active in criticizing the new city council, with the reason being that they are a "shadowy but venal old-boy network".

References

Year of birth missing (living people)
Living people
Mayors of Glendora, California